Bakrala railway station (Urdu and ) is located in Bakrala village, Sohawa Tehsil, Jhelum district, Punjab province, Pakistan.

See also
 List of railway stations in Pakistan
 Pakistan Railways

References

Railway stations in Jhelum District
Railway stations on Karachi–Peshawar Line (ML 1)